Qualification for the sambo events at the 2015 European Games will begin in October  2014. Nations are limited to one entry per weight division. 

77 quotas were chosen by European Sambo Federation.

Qualification summary

References

Qualification
Qualification for the 2015 European Games